The 1979 British Formula One Championship (formally the 1979 Aurora AFX F1 Championship) was the second season of the British Formula One Championship. It commenced on 1 April 1979 and ended on 7 October after fifteen races. The Drivers' Championship was won by Englishman Rupert Keegan who drove an Arrows A1 entered by Charles Clowes.

Teams and drivers

Results and standings

Races

Drivers' standings
Points are awarded to the top ten classified finishers using the following structure:

References

British Formula One Championship
Formula One season
British